Nelson Hernán León Sánchez (born 3 October 1966), known as Nelson León Sánchez or Nelson Sanchez, is a Chilean former professional footballer who played as a forward for clubs in Paraguay, Chile, Greece and Indonesia.

Playing career
León Sánchez played in Paraguay for Guaraní, Libertad and Tembetary until the club was relegated to the second division. Then, he returned to his country of birth and played for Magallanes and Deportes La Serena.

After a stint in the Greek football, he came to Indonesia in 1995 to play for Persma Manado, where he coincided with his compatriots Rodrigo Araya and Juan Rodríguez Rubio. In 1996 he switched to Arema Malang, coinciding with his compatriots Juan Rodríguez Rubio, again, and Julio César Moreno, becoming the first Latin trio to play for the club.

He also played for Persema Malang  and PSMS Medan. He retired in 2000.

Agent career
In 2001 he became a football agent by starting a company called "PT Sanchezgoal Management" based in Cinere, Depok. He has been the representative of players such as Mohamed Sissoko, Ronald Fagundez, Arthur Cunha and Patrick Cruz.

He also was the representative of his compatriot Julio Lopez along with his father, Luis.

Controversies
He and his wife was involved in a case of human trafficking in Paraguay since they took about thirty Indonesian teenagers to that country with no papers, according to the Paraguayan judicial authorities. In principle, the Indonesian teenagers, who were young football players, would be educated and trained in the country to represent Paraguay in the future in the context of a sport project where also took part well-known professional coached such as Miguel Ángel Arrué and Hugo Villasanti.

When he served as the representative of his compatriot Nelson San Martín, the agreed conditions to live in Indonesia weren't suitable, according to San Martín.

Coaching career
In November 2019, he became the coach of Persiba Bantul in the Indonesian Liga 3.

In 2022, he coached PSGJ Cirebon in the same league.

Personal life
He married the Indonesian Teti Citraresmi Rahayu and made his home in Indonesia.

References

External links
 

1966 births
Living people
Chilean footballers
Chilean expatriate footballers
Club Guaraní players
Club Libertad footballers
Club Atlético Tembetary players
Deportes Magallanes footballers
Magallanes footballers
Deportes La Serena footballers
Persma Manado players
Arema F.C. players
Persema Malang players
PSMS Medan players
Paraguayan Primera División players
Primera B de Chile players
Chilean Primera División players
Indonesian Premier Division players
Chilean expatriate sportspeople in Paraguay
Chilean expatriate sportspeople in Greece
Chilean expatriate sportspeople in Indonesia
Expatriate footballers in Paraguay
Expatriate footballers in Greece
Expatriate footballers in Indonesia
Association football forwards
Chilean football managers
Chilean expatriate football managers
Expatriate football managers in Indonesia
Place of birth missing (living people)